Mucin 6, oligomeric mucus/gel-forming, also known as MUC6, is a human gene encoding a protein of the same name. MUC6, along with MUC2, MUC5AC, and MUC5B, is located within the 11p15 chromosomal locus of chromosome 11. MUC6, along with MUC1, is expressed in normal pancreases.

References

06